The locomotive type (Gattungszeichen) of a German steam locomotive was a secondary classification system introduced after 1924 by the Deutsche Reichsbahn-Gesellschaft (DRG) and comprised four parts:
 A letter from the adjacent table, that specified the type of locomotive (express train engine, passenger train locomotive, etc.). 
 A number, usually two-digit, the first digit indicating the number of coupled axles and the second the total number of axles on the locomotive. Tender axles were not included.
 The permitted axle load in tonnes was given next, after a full stop separating it from the preceding axle information.
 If parts of the locomotive exceeded the loading gauge, this was indicated with a triangle over the axle load (see photo below right). If this was simply a removable chimney fitting, this was indicated with an additional bar above the point of the triangle (photo below left).

Example: A DRG Class 01 express train locomotive had the following type classification: S36.20.
That meant: Express train locomotive (Schnellzuglokomotive) with 3 coupled axles, a total of 6 axles and an axle load of 20 tonnes

It was intended to use this type classification system for electric locomotives as well. But because electric locomotives could be used for any duty, this plan was given up.

The primary classification system was based on class numbers which, in the case of steam locomotives ran from 01-99 (see table, right hand column).

Literature 

K-E. Maedel/ A. Gottwald: Deutsche Dampflokomotiven, Transpressverlag, 
Harald Vogelsang: Die Fahrzeuge und Anlagen des Eisenbahnmuseums Bochum-Dahlhausen,

See also 
 History of rail transport in Germany
 Deutsche Reichsbahn
 Deutsche Reichsbahn-Gesellschaft

Locomotives of Germany
Deutsche Reichsbahn-Gesellschaft locomotives
Locomotive classification systems